Saint-Agnant-près-Crocq (literally Saint-Agnant near Crocq; Auvergnat: Sent Anhan de Cròc) is a commune in the Creuse department in central France.

Population

See also
Communes of the Creuse department

References

Communes of Creuse